The 1951 Tipperary Senior Hurling Championship was the 61st staging of the Tipperary Senior Hurling Championship since its establishment by the Tipperary County Board in 1887. The championship began on 7 October 1951 and ended on 4 November 1951.

Borris-Ileigh were the defending champions.

On 4 November 1951, Holycross-Ballycahill won the championship after a 5-15 to 1-04 defeat of Clonoulty in the final at Thurles Sportsfield. It was their second championship title overall and their first title since 1948.

Qualification

Results

Semi-finals

Final

References

Tipperary
Tipperary Senior Hurling Championship